Rauno Esa Nieminen (born June 6, 1955) is a doctor of music 2008, a master of musical instrument building 2006, designer (University of Applied Sciences) 2001, teacher of Arts and Crafts 1991, writer, artist, researcher and musician.

The work of Musical Instrument Builder and Musician started in 1978 Vilppula, Kolho village. He taught guitar building at Ikaalinen Craft and Applied Arts School during 1984–2018. He is still a teacher at Sibelius Academy and University of the Arts Helsinki.

The subject of the dissertation was Soitinten tutkiminen rakentamalla – Esimerkkinä jouhikko (Studying Musical Instruments by Building Them – The Jouhikko as an Example).

He plays kantele, horsehair kantele, wind instruments, percussion instruments, guitars, mandolins and bowed lyres (jouhikko). He has performed in more than 20 countries, including Europe, America, Asia and Africa. Call eg. in the following orchestras: Ontrei, Ural Pop, Verde, Jouhiorkesteri, Teppanan Veljet, Stroka & Nieminen, Primo, Pohjola-trio, World Mänkeri Orchestra.

He has been a full-time musical instrument maker since 1979 at Jyrki Pölkki Musical Workshop 1979–1980, Kaustinen Musical Workshop 1981–1983, Landola Guitars 1992–1999 and Trade Name Rauno Nieminen 1980. He builds guitars, mandolins, bass guitars, kanteles, brass instruments and horsehair kanteles. He is an honorary member of The European Guitar Builders 2016  and an Honorary Chairman of the Finnish Guitar Builders Guild 2015.

He has written numerous books, audio records and magazine articles.

Education 
Nieminen studied at the Sibelius Academy, where he obtained a Doctor of Arts in Music in 2008.

Thesis publications 
  (Doctoral Thesis)

Selected works

References

External links 

 
 
 

1955 births
Finnish luthiers
Kantele players
Guitar makers
Finnish musicians
Finnish writers
Living people
People from Mänttä-Vilppula